Helmut Wagner may refer to:

 Helmut Wagner (Fallschirmjäger) (1915–1944), German Luftwaffe officer
 Helmut Wagner (athlete) (born 1945), East German sprint canoer